= Fuzhou Lakeside International School =

School in Fuzhou, Fujian, China

Fuzhou Lakeside International School 福州西湖国际学校

Address
- No.72 North Meng Shan Road, Gulou District, Fuzhou, Fujian Province, China; China

Information
- School type: Private International School
- Motto: Dignity, Respect, Knowledge, Honor & Integrity. (忠, 恕, 達, 仁.)
- Established: 2012

Fuzhou Lakeside International School is an English-language international school in Fuzhou, China, established in September 2012. It caters to students in grades preschool through high school.

As of 2015, it is Fuzhou's only school that accepts non-Chinese students as well as students from Hong Kong, Taiwan, and Macau.
